Limnonectes limborgi is a species of frog in the Dicroglossidae. It is found in Burma, Thailand, Cambodia, Laos, and Vietnam; it might well occur in Northeast India and Yunnan, China. It is a small frog, males being  and females  snout-vent length.

Taxonomy
Taxonomic work by Robert F. Inger and Bryan L. Stuart in 2010 on Limnonectes hascheanus and L. limborgi has led to better understanding of these similar species — L. limborgi has been considered a junior synonym of L. hascheanus. While the species are morphologically similar, mainly differing in body size (L. hascheanus being smaller), they are genetically distinct. This taxonomic work has also led to redefinition of ranges of both species, and the range of L. limborgi (as presently defined) is much broader than what was reported in the latest (2004) IUCN assessment for this species when it was considered "Data Deficient". However, L. limborgi may in fact consist of several species.

Life cycle
Limnonectes limborgi has nidicolous development: eggs are oviposited terrestrially in a nest; the larvae hatch in the nest and are free-living but non-feeding. Male frogs attend the nest; their skin secretions might inhibit fungal or bacterial infections. This contrast to the earlier belief that Limnonectes limborgi has direct development, i.e., no free-swimming tadpole stage, and hatching as tiny full-formed frogs. Notice that this phenomenon is originally reported for L. hascheanus, but the observations came outside the range of that species, and probably apply to L. limborgi (as currently defined).

References

https://bangkokherps.wordpress.com/frogs/limborgs-frog/

limborgi
Amphibians of Myanmar
Amphibians of Cambodia
Amphibians of Laos
Amphibians of Thailand
Amphibians of Vietnam
Amphibians described in 1892
Taxa named by William Lutley Sclater
Taxonomy articles created by Polbot